Dunton Hot Springs, also known as Dunton, Colorado (unincorporated), is a grouping of log buildings that sits at 8,600 feet on the West Fork of the Dolores River in the San Juan Mountains in the southwestern corner of Colorado. It is currently a ghost town and is historically known for its thermal mineral springs.

History
In 1885, Dunton Hot Springs was a homestead that was settled by Horatio Dunton, a miner. The area was attractive to miners due to he mineral-rich geology, and the hot springs in the area. The Smuggler, Emma, and American mines were located nearby. The settlement was deserted for the most part by 1919 due to the fact that it was difficult to transport ore from the remote location. At the peak of its population, 500 people lived in Dunton.

In the 1890s, Dunton Hot Springs attracted gold miners, trappers and prostitutes. In 1895, Joe and Dominica Roscio founded the town and established a dude ranch there, Rancho Dolores. The Roscio's converted a saloon into a bathhouse for miners.

In 1905, Dunton had a population between 260 and 300.

In the 1970s and 80s, the hot springs attracted travelers, hippies, bikers, musicians and poets who camped in cabins during the summer. The rent for a cabin at the time was a dollar or two per week. During this time, a dude ranch was in operation. Over time, traditional visitors gave way to a demographic who bathed in the hot springs nude.

In 1980, the Rosico family sold the property to investors from New York.

By 1990, the settlement became a ghost town again. In 1994, Christoph Henkel, a German art dealer bought the town, he and a group of German investors developed the site into a resort in the 1990s. In 1987, rooms in the lodge or cabins with hot springs access was $15 per night per person. In 2005, cabins were renting for $600 to $800 per night; by 2018 cabins were renting between $630 to $2,100 per night effectively limiting access to most people other than the wealthy.

Water profile and geology
The hot springs have a low mineral content compared to other Rico area springs. It's water contains primarily calcium-bicarbonate. Dunton spring water is also very low in lithium (below detection), boron, bromide, magnesium and chloride; the presence of these minerals is lower than other area springs.

The two Dunton hot spring vents are situated in red sandstone and shale surface bedrock. The spring lies along a "Miocene N-S fault which is approximately parallel to a local syncline and brings the Jurassic Morrison Formation into contact with older units of the Dolores (Chinle) Formation and the Jurassic Entrada Formations."

Location
Dunton Hot Springs is located in Dolores County, on West Fork Road #38 in Dolores, Colorado, approximately  Northwest of the town of Rico, on the bank of the west fork of the Dolores River. Paradise and Geyser Hot Springs are located nearby.

References

External links

1880s ghost town is now a luxury resort

Unincorporated communities in Dolores County, Colorado
Unincorporated communities in Colorado
Hot springs of Colorado
Bodies of water of Dolores County, Colorado